Qaleh Sohrab (also Romanized as Qal‘eh Sohrāb; also known as Sohrāb) is a village in Kheyrgu Rural District, Alamarvdasht District, Lamerd County, Fars Province, Iran. At the 2006 census, its population was 307, in 55 families.

References 

Populated places in Lamerd County